Camí dels Reis is a station of the Palma Metro in Palma on the island of Majorca, Spain.

The underground station, which opened 25 April 2007, is located at the northerly end of Gran Via Asima near Camí dels Reis after which it is named.

References

Palma Metro stations
Railway stations in Spain opened in 2007